Ciechocin may refer to the following places:
Ciechocin, Kuyavian-Pomeranian Voivodeship (north-central Poland)
Ciechocin, Lublin Voivodeship (east Poland)
Ciechocin, Pomeranian Voivodeship (north Poland)